Martina Kuenz (born 1 November 1994) is an Austrian freestyle wrestler. At the 2018 World Wrestling Championships held in Budapest, Hungary, she won one of the bronze medals in the women's 72 kg event. She is also a two-time medalist at the European Wrestling Championships.

Career 

In 2010, she competed in the girls' freestyle 70 kg event at the Summer Youth Olympics held in Singapore. She finished in 5th place. In 2013, she was eliminated in her first match in the 67 kg event at the European Wrestling Championships held in Tbilisi, Georgia.

She represented Austria at the 2015 European Games in Baku, Azerbaijan; she lost her bronze medal match in the 69 kg event. She also represented Austria four years later in the 76 kg event at the 2019 European Games in Minsk, Belarus. In this competition she was eliminated by Natalia Vorobieva of Russia in the repechage.

In 2019, she won the silver medal in the 76 kg event at the European Wrestling Championships held in Bucharest, Romania. In the final, she lost against Yasemin Adar of Turkey.

In January 2021, she won the gold medal in the 76 kg event at the Grand Prix de France Henri Deglane 2021 held in Nice, France. In March 2021, she competed at the European Qualification Tournament in Budapest, Hungary hoping to qualify for the 2020 Summer Olympics in Tokyo, Japan. She did not qualify as she lost her match in the semi-finals against Natalia Vorobieva. She also failed to qualify for the Olympics at the World Olympic Qualification Tournament held in Sofia, Bulgaria. She lost her match in the semi-finals against Yasemin Adar of Turkey and she then also lost her bronze medal match against Milaimys Marín of Cuba.

In 2022, she won the silver medal in the 76 kg event at the Yasar Dogu Tournament held in Istanbul, Turkey. She competed in the 76 kg event at the 2022 European Wrestling Championships held in Budapest, Hungary where she was eliminated in her first match. A few months later, she won the bronze medal in her event at the Matteo Pellicone Ranking Series 2022 held in Rome, Italy.

She competed in the 76 kg event at the 2022 World Wrestling Championships held in Belgrade, Serbia. She won her first match against Tatiana Rentería of Colombia and she then lost against eventual silver medalist Samar Amer of Egypt. She was then eliminated in the repechage by Justina Di Stasio of Canada.

Achievements

References

External links 
 

Living people
1994 births
Place of birth missing (living people)
Austrian female sport wrestlers
World Wrestling Championships medalists
Wrestlers at the 2010 Summer Youth Olympics
Wrestlers at the 2015 European Games
Wrestlers at the 2019 European Games
European Games competitors for Austria
European Wrestling Championships medalists
21st-century Austrian women